The Chain Store Labor Unions Council (CHAIN RENGO) was a trade union representing retail workers in Japan.

The union was established in 1970, and by 1983 it had 40,000 members.  It remained unaffiliated for many years, but in 1989 became a founding affiliate of the Japanese Trade Union Confederation.  By 1996, its membership was 40,944.  On 4 July 2001, it merged with the Japan Federation of Commercial Workers' Unions and the Seven Department Store Unions' Council, to form the Japan Federation of Service and Distributive Workers' Unions.

References

Retail trade unions
Trade unions established in 1970
Trade unions disestablished in 2001
Trade unions in Japan